Kato Kleines (before 1926: Κάτω Κλέστινα - Kato Klestina; Bulgarian and Macedonian: Долно Клештино, Dolno Kleštino) is a village and a former municipality in Florina regional unit, West Macedonia, Greece. Since the 2011 local government reform it is part of the municipality Florina, of which it is a municipal unit. The municipal unit has an area of 188.564 km2. It is 7 km north of the city of Florina. The population was 2,735 in 2011.

History 

The village was first mentioned in an Ottoman defter of 1468, where it is listed under the name of Kleshtino and described as having ninety-seven households. In 1481, the village possessed two hundred and thirteen households, a church, mills, and a kiln. The Turkish documents suggest a prosperous place, noting the production of vines, walnuts, onions, garlic, cabbage, peas, flax, honey, pigs, and silkworms.

In 1845 the Russian slavist Victor Grigorovich recorded Kleshtina (Клештина) as mainly Bulgarian village. Johann Georg von Hahn in his map from 1861 marked the village as Bulgarian, too. Besides Slav-speaking  population there were 150 Albanians in Kato Kleines in the end of 19th century. According to the statistics of Geographers Dimitri Mishev and D. M. Brancoff, the village had a total Christian population of 504 in 1905, all Patriarchist Bulgarians. It also had 1 Greek school.

Muslims of Kato Klestina were Albanian speakers. The Greek census (1920) recorded 792 people in the village and in 1923 there were 320 inhabitants (or 49 families) who were Muslim. Following the Greek-Turkish population exchange, in 1926 within Kato Klestina there were refugee families from East Thrace (2), Asia Minor (1) and the Caucasus (74). The Greek census (1928) recorded 817 village inhabitants. In 1928, there were 77 refugee families (288 people). 

Kato Kleines had 523 inhabitants in 1981. In fieldwork done by Riki Van Boeschoten in late 1993, Kato Kleines was populated by  a Greek population descended from Anatolian Greek refugees who arrived during the Greek-Turkish population exchange, and Slavophones. The Macedonian language was spoken in the village by people over 30 in public and private settings. Children understood the language, but mostly did not use it. Pontic Greek was spoken by people over 60, mainly in private.

Notes

Former municipalities in Western Macedonia
Populated places in Florina (regional unit)